Korf (also Romanized as Kūrf; also known as Kafar) is a village in Darband Rural District, Jolgeh Sankhvast District, Jajrom County, North Khorasan Province, Iran. At the 2006 census, its population was 696, in 202 families.

References 

Populated places in Jajrom County